The 1929–30 season was the 55th season of competitive football in England.

Events
The Wednesday officially changed their name to Sheffield Wednesday prior to the start of this season.

Blackpool claimed their only championship to date on the final day of the Division Two season, 3 May, with a goalless draw at Nottingham Forest. Runners-up Chelsea could have won the title themselves the same afternoon if they had won and Blackpool had lost, but the Londoners were defeated at Bury by a single goal. Blackpool forward, Jimmy Hampson, finished the season as the top goal scorer in England, with 46 goals in all competitions.

Deaths
29 September, Joe Schofield—manager of Port Vale and former England international

Honours

Notes = Number in parentheses is the times that club has won that honour. * indicates new record for competition

Football League

First Division

Second Division

Third Division North

Third Division South

Top goalscorers

First Division
Vic Watson (West Ham United) – 41 goals

Second Division
Jimmy Hampson (Blackpool) – 45 goals

Third Division North
Frank Newton (Stockport County) – 36 goals

Third Division South
George Goddard (Queens Park Rangers) – 37 goals

References